Juan Castellón Larenas (1843 – September 14, 1919) was a Chilean lawyer who served as foreign minister of Chile (1889–1890, 1892) and justice minister (1891). He served as a senator (1891–1897, 1909–1915) and deputy (1876–1879, 1882–1891, 1914–1915).

References

1843 births
1919 deaths
Members of the Chamber of Deputies of Chile
Foreign ministers of Chile
People from Concepción, Chile
Members of the Senate of Chile
19th-century Chilean lawyers